Vikarbyn is a locality situated in Rättvik Municipality, Dalarna County, Sweden with 1,171 inhabitants in 2010. Vikarbyn is situated by lake Siljan.

In Vikarbyn, there is a school for pupils aged 7–11 years, a grocery store, a restaurant and two furnishing shops.

References 

Populated places in Dalarna County
Populated places in Rättvik Municipality